Cadherin related family member 3 (CDHR3), also known as CDH28 or its abbreviation CDHR3, is a protein that in humans is encoded by the CDHR3 gene.
 The protein is predominately expressed in respiratory epithelium and the first notion of its clinical implications was from the discovery that genetic variation of CDHR3 is strongly associated to early severe asthma exacerbations in children. Subsequent studies have suggested that CDHR3 is a receptor for a subtype of rhinovirus.

Function and cellular location 
The exact physiological role of CDHR3 is not known, but as the CDHR3 protein is expressed in epithelial tissues and has six extracellular cadherin domains plus a short transmembrane segment, it is believed to be related to the function of similar cadherins which function in cell adhesion and cell-to-cell signaling.
Two single-cell RNA expression studies furthermore found CDHR3 to be highly selectively expressed in ciliated epithelial cells, compared to other cell types in the respiratory epithelium, and thereby to be a marker for ciliated cells in respiratory airway tissue.

Clinical significance 
A nonsynonymous mutation in CDHR3 at rs6967330 (C529Y) was at first found to be associated with severe asthma exacerbations in early childhood, with genome-wide significance. Functional experiments further indicated that this gene polymorphism leads to increased surface expression of the CDHR3 protein. A subsequent study found that CDHR3 is a probable receptor for rhinovirus type C, a common form of rhinovirus.

Recent studies furthermore found that CDHR3 gene variation is not associated with childhood bronchiolitis from respiratory syncytial virus (RSV) infection, which resemble early asthma exacerbations as a phenotype. However, childhood bronchiolitis not caused by RSV infection, of which rhinovirus is often implicated, was associated with the CDHR3 gene variation. This is line with the results from a study on chronic rhinosinusitis, which often is associated rhinovirus infection, where CDHR3 gene variation also was found to be a strong risk factor. Therefore, CDHR3 seems to causally linked to increased propensity for rhinovirus C infection.

References

Further reading